Malacca Sultanate Watermill is a replica watermill located along the bank of Malacca River in Malacca City, Malacca, Malaysia, which was built in 2007 and completed in March 2008. It is the first and largest watermill in Malaysia, standing at a height of 13 meters and was built based on Islamic technology found in Syria and China.

See also
 List of tourist attractions in Malacca

References

2008 establishments in Malaysia
Buildings and structures in Malacca City
Energy infrastructure completed in 2008
Watermills